Gimmelwald is a small traffic free village in the Bernese Oberland in the Canton of Bern, Switzerland, and is located between Stechelberg and Mürren, at an elevation of 1363 meters (4472 feet). The village is at the foot of the UNESCO World Heritage site the Jungfrau-Aletsch Protected Area. Gimmelwald is an allemanic linear village and a walser settlement first mentioned in a bill of sale in 1346. Because of its very typical and exceptional townscape, Gimmelwald is part of the inventory of Swiss heritage.

Gimmelwald is one of the few traffic-free villages in Switzerland where access by car is not possible due to a missing road connection. The Schilthorn cable car stops in Gimmelwald, where it is possible to board another cable car which runs between Gimmelwald and Mürren. Farming and tourism are the main source of income today. Farmers raise hay on tiny plots of land to feed small herds of cows. In winter, farmers often work as well for the Schilthorn cable car by performing jobs like running ski lifts or ski-slope grooming.

In the year 2003 the population of Gimmelwald was 130. The local school closed in 2010 due to the small number of students and students now attend the school in Lauterbrunnen. The school building was bought in 2019 by a cooperative to convert the school building into flats and to prevent it from being used as a holiday flat.

Traffic and accessibility
There is a walking path between Gimmelwald and Mürren, but lacking connection to the main road system, the main transportation to Gimmelwald is the Luftseilbahn Stechelberg-Mürren-Schilthorn (LSMS) aerial tramway famous for connecting the Schilthorn. The cable car connects Gimmelwald with the neighbouring elevated village Mürren and the village Stechelberg, which is situated at the floor of the Lauterbrunnen valley. From Stechelberg a bus connects Lauterbrunnen where there are connections to the rest of Switzerland.

Politics
Gimmelwald, together with Wengen, Mürren, Isenfluh, Stechelberg, and Lauterbrunnen, belongs to the municipality of Lauterbrunnen. The parish covers the entire valley.

Tourism
The main source of income for Gimmelwald is tourism, and the village has a small hotel, former pension (now a British run hotel), a bed & breakfast and the Mountain Hostel. Gimmelwald was stopped from being developed into a large ski resort by having it declared an avalanche zone which is only partly the case. In summer, Gimmelwald is mostly visited by tourists from North America, and in winter is mostly visited by European and Swiss tourists for winter sports.

Gimmelwald has a 2.2 km long via ferrata connecting the neighbouring village of Mürren.

References

External links

Gimmelwald tourism
Gimmelwald Mountain Hostel
Klettersteig/Via Ferrata Mürren–Gimmelwald
Rick Steves Gimmelwald

Villages in the canton of Bern
Bernese Oberland
Ski areas and resorts in Switzerland
Car-free villages in Switzerland